Goč (Serbian Cyrillic: Гоч) is a mountainous area in central Serbia, about 15 km south of the spa town of Vrnjačka Banja.

Goč is a popular hiking and mountaineering destination and the village Goč is a small ski resort. The skiing area is equipped with a single-seater ski lift and the longest slope is 1,500 m long and 40 m wide. The artificial lake Selište is located in the area as well.

Gallery

See also
 List of mountains in Serbia
 Article about the village Goč (in Serbian)

References

External links
Ski and Snowboard School "Aki" in Serbian and English

Mountains of Serbia
Nature reserves in Serbia
Rhodope mountain range